= Edmunds Store, Virginia =

Unincorporated community in Virginia, United States

Coordinates: 36°52′36″N 77°56′31″W

Edmunds Store is an unincorporated community located in Brunswick County, in the U.S. state of Virginia.
